The West German Athletics Championships was an annual outdoor track and field competition organised by the German Athletics Association, which served as the West German national championships for the sport. The two- or three-day event was held in summer months, varying from late June to early August, and the venue changed annually.

The German Athletics Championships had a long history, dating back to 1898. After the division of Germany at the end of World War II, the organising body of the all-Germany championships, the German Athletics Association, remained in West Germany. As a result, when the national championships resumed in 1946, only West German athletes could compete in them. This prompted the creation of the East German Athletics Championships.

Events
The following athletics events were held at the West German Championships:

Track
100 metres, 200 metres, 400 metres, 800 metres, 1500 metres, 3000 metres (women only), 5000 metres (men only), 10,000 metres, marathon
Obstacles
100 metres hurdles (women only), 110 metres hurdles (men only), 400 metres hurdles, 3000 metres steeplechase (men only)
Jumping
Pole vault (men only), high jump, long jump, triple jump (men only)
Throwing
Shot put, discus throw, javelin throw, hammer throw (men only)
Combined events
Decathlon (men only), heptathlon (women only)

A men's 200 metres hurdles was held up to the 1965 championships, and a men's pentathlon was on the combined events programme through 1973.

Women's events expanded with the international acceptance of women's athletics. The women's 1500 metres was added in 1968, 3000 metres in 1973, and 10,000 mW ten years later. The 80 metres hurdles was held until 1968, when it was replaced by the international standard 100 metres hurdles. A women's 400 m hurdles was first held in 1975. The last women's pentathlon was held in 1980, then replaced by the new heptathlon event. Women's triple jump, pole vault, hammer throw and steeplechase were not held, as they were not yet standard international events.

Editions

References

 
National athletics competitions
Athletics competitions in West Germany
1946 establishments in Germany
1990 disestablishments in West Germany
Recurring sporting events established in 1946
Recurring sporting events disestablished in 1990
Athletics
Defunct athletics competitions